The 1929–30 Magyar Kupa (English: Hungarian Cup) was the 12th season of Hungary's annual knock-out cup football competition.

Final

See also
 1929–30 Nemzeti Bajnokság I

References

External links
 Official site 
 soccerway.com

1929–30 in Hungarian football
1929–30 domestic association football cups
1929-30